Clemis is a given name and surname. Notable people with the name include:

Clemis Abraham (1918–2002), Syriac Orthodox Church bishop
Kuriakose Clemis (born 1936), Malankara Orthodox Syrian Church official
Baselios Cleemis (born 1959), Archbishop of the Syro-Malankara Catholic Church